Bungee may refer to:

 Bungee cord, also called shock cord, an engineered stretchable cord
 Bungee chair, a type of office or lounge chair made with bungee cords
 Bungee jumping, an adventure sport
 Bungee language or Bungi creole, a language and its related population, which exist mainly along the north–south trade routes of Manitoba, Canada

See also
 Bungie, an independent video game developer